Bennett Peak is a high and prominent mountain summit in the San Juan Mountains range of the Rocky Mountains System, in southwestern Colorado.  

Bennett Peak is the highest point in Rio Grande County.

Historical names
Bennett Mountain
Bennett Peak

See also
List of mountain peaks of Colorado
List of Colorado county high points

References

External links

San Juan Mountains (Colorado)
Mountains of Rio Grande County, Colorado
Rio Grande National Forest
North American 4000 m summits
Mountains of Colorado